Hard Drive is an album by drummer Art Blakey with The Jazz Messengers recorded in late 1957 and originally released on the Bethlehem label. It is notable for constituting the first recorded use of the term 'hard drive' to refer to a computer memory drive.

Reception

Allmusic awarded the album 3 stars stating "The music on this album is typical hard bop of the period, well played and full of enthusiasm and fire".

Track listing 
 "For Minors Only" (Jimmy Heath) - 5:49   
 "Right Down Front" (Johnny Griffin) - 4:31   
 "Deo-X" (Bill Hardman) - 5:50   
 "Sweet Sakeena" (Hardman) - 5:06   
 "For Miles and Miles" (Heath) - 5:24   
 "Krafty" (Griffin) - 6:35   
 "Late Spring" (Leon Mitchell) - 5:36  
Recorded in New York City on October 9 (track 3) and October 11 (tracks 1, 2 & 4–7), 1957

Personnel 
Art Blakey - drums
Bill Hardman - trumpet  
Johnny Griffin - tenor saxophone  
Junior Mance (tracks 1, 2 & 4–7), Sam Dockery (track 3) - piano
Spanky DeBrest - bass

References 

Art Blakey albums
The Jazz Messengers albums
1957 albums
Bethlehem Records albums